Abduhashim Ismailov is a Kurdish musician from Uzbekistan. His music is included in the Smithsonian Institution's Uzbekistan: Echoes of Vanished Courts as part of their Smithsonian Folkways collection.

References

Kurdish musicians